Thomas Duppa was an English politician. He was a Member of Parliament for Truro, Cornwall in 1554 as the second member to William Iseham. This was under the reign of Queen Mary when parliament met at Oxford.

Notes

References

Members of the pre-1707 English Parliament for constituencies in Cornwall
Year of death missing
Year of birth missing
English MPs 1554
Alumni of Queens' College, Cambridge